"You Know I Love You... Don't You?" was a single from Howard Jones's third studio album One to One.  It was his first single not to enter the UK Top 40, peaking at #43, although it did reach #34 in the rival Network Chart. It fared much better in the US reaching #17 in the Billboard Hot 100 chart.

Track listing
All tracks were written by Jones.

UK release
7"
"You Know I Love You... Don't You?" – 4:04
"Dig This Well Deep" – 4:33

12"
"You Know I Love You... Don't You?" (Dance in the Fields Mix) – 7:19
"Dig This Well Deep" - 4:34
"You Know I Love You... Don't You?" (instrumental) – 5:58

NOTE: A limited edition double pack was available in both 7" and 12" format, which included a single-sided bonus disc featuring the song
"Hide & Seek (Orchestral)"

US release
7"
"You Know I Love You... Don't You?" – 4:04
"Dig This Well Deep" – 4:33

12"
"You Know I Love You... Don't You?" (Dance in the Fields Mix) – 7:19
"You Know I Love You... Don't You?" (instrumental) – 5:58
"You Know I Love You... Don't You?" (edited version) – 3:45
"Roll Right Up" – 4:45

References

External links
Artist discography at discogs.com
[ Billboard.com] for US artist chart history
UK chart history at OfficialCharts.com

1986 singles
1986 songs
Howard Jones (English musician) songs
Songs written by Howard Jones (English musician)
Song recordings produced by Arif Mardin
Music videos directed by Wayne Isham
Warner Music Group singles
Elektra Records singles